Two human polls comprise the 2014 National Collegiate Athletic Association (NCAA) Division I Football Championship Subdivision (FCS) football rankings, in addition to various publications' preseason polls. Unlike the Football Bowl Subdivision (FBS), college football's governing body, the NCAA, bestows the national championship title through a 24-team tournament. The following weekly polls determine the top 25 teams at the NCAA Division I Football Championship Subdivision level of college football for the 2014 season. The Sports Network poll is voted by media members while the Coaches' Poll is determined by coaches at the FCS level.

Legend

The Sports Network Poll

Coaches' Poll

References

Rankings
NCAA Division I FCS football rankings